Storhamar Church is a parish church of the Church of Norway in Hamar Municipality in Innlandet county, Norway. It is located in the town of Hamar. It is one of the churches for the Hamar parish which is part of the Hamar domprosti (deanery) in the Diocese of Hamar. The white, concrete church was built in a rectangular design in 1975 using plans drawn up by the architect Willy Sveen. The church seats about 380 people.

History
As the town of Hamar grew, the need for a new church in the town became apparent. In 1971, land in a residential area in the west part of the town was acquired for a new church. The church was designed by Willy Sveen. The church was constructed out of concrete blocks during 1974–1975. It was consecrated on 5 October 1975.

See also
List of churches in Hamar

References

Buildings and structures in Hamar
Churches in Innlandet
Rectangular churches in Norway
Concrete churches in Norway
20th-century Church of Norway church buildings
Churches completed in 1975
1975 establishments in Norway